Diffuse infiltrative lymphocytosis syndrome occurs in HIV positive patients with low CD4 counts.

It is similar to Sjögren's syndrome, with painless parotid and submandibular swelling, and sicca symptoms.

The syndrome typically improves with HAART.

References

HIV/AIDS
Lymphocytic disorders
Syndromes